Murilo is a village, atoll, and municipality in the state of Chuuk, Federated States of Micronesia.

It is located 9 km to the NE of Nomwin Atoll and 101 km to the NNE of Chuuk Lagoon. Its population is over a 1,000 people. Together with Nomwin, Ruo, and Fananu they form the Hall Islands.

In 2010, the people of this small atoll ate at a "feast" of poisonous, critically endangered hawksbill turtles - 96 got seriously ill, 6 died, 4 of them children.

References

Municipalities of Chuuk State
Islands of Chuuk State
Atolls of the Federated States of Micronesia